This is the discography of South Korean singer Seven.

Albums

Studio albums

Compilation albums

Extended plays

Singles

Other charted songs

Guest appearances

Soundtrack appearances

Music videos

Notes

References

Discographies of South Korean artists
Pop music discographies
Rhythm and blues discographies